The 1944 NCAA Swimming and Diving Championships were contested in March 1944 at the Payne Whitney Gymnasium at Yale University in New Haven, Connecticut at the eighth annual NCAA-sanctioned swim meet to determine the team and individual national champions of men's collegiate swimming and diving in the United States. 

Hosts Yale topped the team standings, thus capturing the Bulldogs' second title in program history. Yale finished one point ahead of perennial power Michigan.

Team standings
Note: Top 10 only
(H) = Hosts

See also
List of college swimming and diving teams

References

NCAA Division I Men's Swimming and Diving Championships
NCAA Swimming And Diving Championships
NCAA Swimming And Diving Championships